Césario Concepción Martínez, (28 July 1909 – 11 March 1974), was a Puerto Rican musician, big band leader and composer, who brought the music of his native land to the United States, mainly New York City, and Latin American ballroom dancing between the 1940s and early 1970s and to ballrooms all over the world.  He popularized the modern plena as a Latin song style.

Concepción was born in Cayey, Puerto Rico, and was a prolific composer, writing music based on contemporary Puerto Rican scenes and vistas.  He wrote over 100 mambos, calypsos, boleros and plenas songs to honor cities such as San Juan, Mayagüez, Ponce, Yauco, Plena Criolla (for Caguas), San German, Pa Mi Pueblo, Cayey his town and Santurce among many others. In addition, he directed his own orchestra non stop for 27 years.   

In 1933 together with his family boarded a ship, SS San Juan and migrated to New York City. Here he played as lead trumpet for many big bands, however spent most of his time with Eddie LeBaron and His Orchestra, which played at the Rainbow Room, a landmark,  located on the 65th floor of Rockefeller Center until it closed in 1942.   

Upon his return to Puerto Rico founded, on June 14, 1947, "César Concepción y su Orquesta" and made its first presentation at the New Yorker Hotel, later known as Flamboyan Hotel, via live broadcast from WIAC radio station.   

His orchestra which consisted of 15 musicians was known for decades as the “best and most popular orchestra in Puerto Rico”, which was presented for many years by radio and television legendary personality Mariano Artau. Together with singer Joe Valle the orchestra obtained its highest popularity. 

He died in Río Piedras, Puerto Rico of a heart attack at the age of 64.

Further reading
 Aparicio, Frances R., "Listening to salsa: gender, Latin popular music, and Puerto Rican cultures", Wesleyan University Press, 1998. . Cf. p. 33

See also
List of Puerto Ricans

References

1909 births
1974 deaths
People from Cayey, Puerto Rico
20th-century Puerto Rican musicians
20th-century conductors (music)